Do Qaleh may refer to:
 Do Qaleh, Hamadan
 Do Qaleh, Razavi Khorasan